Gerard Lagos (born 25 August 1968) is an American former professional soccer player who played for the Minnesota Thunder. His father is Buzz Lagos and his brother is Manny Lagos.

Professional
Lagos spent his entire career with the Minnesota Thunder, scoring the team's first goal in 1990.  The Thunder were created by Lagos' father Buzz in 1990 as an unaffiliated amateur team.  The Thunder played their first game against the professional Winnipeg Fury of the Canadian Soccer League.  Lagos scored the first goal of the game, a 2-1 victory for the Thunder.  In 1994, the Thunder turned professional with the USISL.  When Lagos retired in 2001, he was the last surviving member of the original team.  He was inducted into the Thunder Hall of Fame in 2002.

National team
In 1989, Lagos was an integral part of the United States U20 national team which took fourth place at the 1989 FIFA World Youth Championship.  He played five games, in the tournament.

References

External links
 Player profile at FIFA
Player profile at University of Wisconsin–Milwaukee

1968 births
Living people
American soccer players
USISL players
A-League (1995–2004) players
Minnesota Thunder players
University of Wisconsin–Milwaukee alumni
Sportspeople from Saint Paul, Minnesota
United States men's under-20 international soccer players
Association football forwards